Tuntum Esporte Clube, known as Tuntum, is a Brazilian football club based in Tuntum, Maranhão state. Founded in 2021, the club plays in the Campeonato Maranhense.

History
Founded on 1 June 2021, the club won a spot in the year's  after  ceased their activities and allowed the new club to use their CNPJ. During their first competition, the club achieved promotion to the Campeonato Maranhense, reaching the finals but losing the title to Cordino.

Tuntum won the title of the 2021 Copa Federação Maranhense de Futebol after defeating Juventude Samas in the finals, and opted to play in the 2022 Copa do Brasil.

Honours
Copa Federação Maranhense de Futebol: 2021

References

Association football clubs established in 2021
Football clubs in Maranhão
2021 establishments in Brazil